You Are Too Beautiful is a 1932 song written by Richard Rodgers and Lorenz Hart for the 1933 film Hallelujah, I'm a Bum, where it was sung by Al Jolson. It became a pop and jazz standard in the 1940s, with a notable recording made on August 3, 1945 by Dick Haymes (Decca 23750).

Other recordings
Other versions include those by:
Frank Sinatra (1945)
Cannonball Adderley on Julian Cannonball Adderley and Strings (1955)
Thelonious Monk on The Unique Thelonious Monk (1956)
Warne Marsh on Music for Prancing (1957)
David Whitfield on Alone (1961)
John Coltrane and Johnny Hartman on John Coltrane and Johnny Hartman (1963)
Sarah Vaughan on Crazy and Mixed Up (1982)

References

1932 songs
1930s jazz standards
Songs with music by Richard Rodgers
Songs with lyrics by Lorenz Hart
Al Jolson songs